Alfred "Butch" Beard Jr. (born May 5, 1947) is an American former professional basketball player and coach. He was the starting point guard with the 1975 NBA champion Golden State Warriors.

Career

Early years
Beard played high school basketball at Breckinridge County High School where, as a junior, he led the Bearcats to the 1964 state championship game losing to a Wes Unseld-led Louisville Seneca team. Beard and Unseld would later become roommates at the University of Louisville. In 1965, Beard led the Bearcats back to the title game, winning the state championship. Additionally, he was named the Kentucky Mr. Basketball.

Butch Beard played college basketball at the University of Louisville.

NBA
Beard was selected by the Dallas Chaparrals in the 1969 ABA draft and by the Atlanta Hawks in the first round of the 1969 NBA draft. Beard played nine seasons (1969–1970; 1971–1979) with five teams: the Atlanta Hawks, the Cleveland Cavaliers, the Seattle SuperSonics, the Golden State Warriors, and the New York Knicks. He scored 5,622 career points and represented Cleveland in the 1972 NBA All-Star Game. While with the Warriors he scored the last seven points of the team's 1975 NBA Championship win. Beard retired as an NBA player in 1979, last playing for the New York Knicks.

Coaching
Beard later served as head coach of the New Jersey Nets from 1994 to 1996. He was also color analyst for New York Knicks games on MSG Network during the 1980s.  He was the head coach at Howard University from 1990 to 1994 and head coach at Morgan State University until he stepped down in March 2006.

NBA career statistics

Regular season

|-
| align="left" | 1969–70
| align="left" | Atlanta
| 72 || - || 13.1 || .467 || - || .828 || 1.9 || 1.7 || - || - || 7.0
|-
| align="left" | 1971–72
| align="left" | Cleveland
| 68 || - || 35.8 || .464 || - || .760 || 4.1 || 6.7 || - || - || 15.4
|-
| align="left" | 1972–73
| align="left" | Seattle
| 73 || - || 19.2 || .439 || - || .714 || 2.4 || 3.4 || - || - || 6.6
|-
| align="left" | 1973–74
| align="left" | Golden State
| 79 || - || 27.0 || .512 || - || .739 || 4.9 || 3.8 || 1.3 || 0.1 || 10.2
|-
| style="text-align:left;background:#afe6ba;" | 1974–75†
| align="left" | Golden State
| 82 || - || 30.7 || .528 || - || .832 || 3.9 || 4.2 || 1.6 || 0.1 || 12.8
|-
| align="left" | 1975–76
| align="left" | Cleveland
| 15 || - || 17.0 || .389 || - || .730 || 2.9 || 3.0 || 0.7 || 0.1 || 6.5
|-
| align="left" | 1975–76
| align="left" | New York
| 60 || - || 24.2 || .475 || - || .755 || 4.5 || 2.9 || 1.2 || 0.1 || 8.4
|-
| align="left" | 1976–77
| align="left" | New York
| 70 || - || 15.5 || .505 || - || .688 || 2.3 || 2.1 || 0.8 || 0.1 || 5.3
|-
| align="left" | 1977–78
| align="left" | New York
| 79 || - || 25.1 || .502 || - || .806 || 3.3 || 4.3 || 1.5 || 0.0 || 9.4
|-
| align="left" | 1978–79
| align="left" | New York
| 7 || - || 12.1 || .423 || - || .000 || 1.4 || 2.7 || 1.0 || 0.0 || 3.1
|- class="sortbottom"
| style="text-align:center;" colspan="2"| Career
| 605 || - || 23.6 || .487 || - || .771 || 3.4 || 3.6 || 1.3 || 0.1 || 9.3
|}

Playoffs

|-
| align="left" | 1969–70
| align="left" | Atlanta
| 9 || - || 16.2 || .477 || - || .731 || 2.9 || 0.9 || - || - || 9.0
|-
| style="text-align:left;background:#afe6ba;" | 1974–75†
| align="left" | Golden State
| style="background:#cfecec;" | 17* || - || 26.4 || .411 || - || .642 || 4.2 || 3.1 || 1.4 || 0.1 || 9.1
|-
| align="left" | 1977–78
| align="left" | New York
| 6 || - || 26.7 || .500 || - || .600 || 3.5 || 4.5 || 1.7 || 0.3 || 9.0
|- class="sortbottom"
| style="text-align:center;" colspan="2"| Career
| 32 || - || 23.6 || .444 || - || .663 || 3.7 || 2.8 || 1.5 || 0.2 || 9.0
|}

Bibliography
 Butch Beard's Basic Basketball: The Complete Player (M. Kesend, 1994),

References

External links
 Butch Beard career player stats at basketball-reference.com

1947 births
Living people
African-American basketball players
All-American college men's basketball players
Basketball coaches from Kentucky
Atlanta Hawks draft picks
Atlanta Hawks players
Basketball players from Kentucky
Cleveland Cavaliers expansion draft picks
Cleveland Cavaliers players
Dallas Chaparrals draft picks
Dallas Mavericks assistant coaches
Golden State Warriors players
Howard Bison men's basketball coaches
International Basketball League (1999–2001) coaches
Louisville Cardinals men's basketball players
Morgan State Bears men's basketball coaches
National Basketball Association All-Stars
New Jersey Nets head coaches
New York Knicks announcers
New York Knicks players
Parade High School All-Americans (boys' basketball)
People from Hardinsburg, Kentucky
Seattle SuperSonics players
American men's basketball players
Guards (basketball)
21st-century African-American people
20th-century African-American sportspeople